Puerto Seguro (English: Safe Harbor) is a municipality located in the province of Salamanca, Castile and León, Spain. As of 2016 the municipality has a population of 64 inhabitants.

See also
List of municipalities in Salamanca

References

Municipalities in the Province of Salamanca